Cedar Grove is an unincorporated community in Randolph County, North Carolina, United States.

References

 

Unincorporated communities in Randolph County, North Carolina
Unincorporated communities in North Carolina